The Keira dynasty were the rulers of the Sultanate of Darfur from the seventeenth century until 1916. Originally the Keira clan were perhaps regional rulers in the Tunjur state, with Sulayman traditionally seen as the founder of the Darfur state. The monarchy was suspended after the Egyptian conquest of the region in 1874, but was revived as a de facto independent state in 1898 after the defeat of the Mahdiyah. The Keira dynasty finally ended in 1916 when the British annexed Darfur to the Sudan.

As of 2012, the family includes Ali B. Ali-Dinar, the grandson of the last ruling Sultan.

List of Sultans of Darfur
Daali
Kuuru
Tunsam
Sulayman c. 1660-c. 1680
Musa
Ahmad Bukr early 18th century - c. 1730
Muhammad Dawra
Umar Lel ruled until c. 1752/3 (c. AH 1166)
Abu'l Qasim
Muhammad Tayrab ruled until 1785/6 (AH 1200)
Abd al-Rahman 1785/6 (AH 1200)-c. 1801
Muhammad al-Fadl c. 1801-1838
Muhammad al-Husayn 1838-1873
Ibrahim 1873-1874
Ali Dinar 1898-1916

References

 
History of Sudan
Darfur